Joel Dorman Steele (May 14, 1836 – May 25, 1886) was an American educator. He and his wife Esther Baker Steele were important textbook writers of their period, on subjects including American history, chemistry, human physiology, physics, astronomy, and zoology. In the preface to his posthumous Popular Physics, the publisher writes that his books "attained an extraordinary degree of popularity, due to the author's attractive style, his great skill in the selection of material suited to the demands of the schools for which the books were intended, his sympathetic spirit toward both teachers and pupils, and his earnest Christian character, which was exhibited in all his writing."

Born May 14, 1836, in Lima, New York, he became a country schoolteacher at the age of 17, leaving that position after an outbreak of typhoid fever killed his mother in 1851. He graduated from Genesee College (which later became Syracuse University) in 1858, and became a school principal in Oswego County in 1859. After being seriously injured in the American civil war, he returned to a school principalship in 1862, in Newark, New York, and in 1866 moved to another school in Elmira, New York. In 1872 he gave up teaching and devoted himself to full-time writing. He died in Elmira, on May 25, 1886.

Steele is the namesake of the Joel Dorman Steele professorship at Syracuse University, currently held by A. P. Balachandran. It was announced on October 18, 2012 that Prof Mark Bowick would take over the position. The Steele Memorial Library in Elmira is also named after him; Esther Baker Steele Hall at Syracuse University is named after his wife.

Books

New Descriptive Astronomy, A.S. Barnes & Company, 1869, 1884.
Fourteen Weeks in Human Physiology, 1872. Revised as Hygienic Physiology: With Special Reference to the Use of Alcoholic Drinks and Narcotics, 1888.
Fourteen Weeks in Chemistry, 1873. Revised as Popular Chemistry, 1887.
Fourteen Weeks in Natural Philosophy, 1873.
Fourteen Weeks in Descriptive Astronomy, 1874. Revised as Popular Astronomy: Being the New Descriptive Astronomy, 1899.
Barnes' Centenary History: One Hundred Years of American Independence, 1875.
The Story of the Rocks: Fourteen Weeks in Popular Geology, 1877.
Fourteen Weeks in Physics, 1878. Revised as Popular Physics, 1888, and The Chautauqua Course in Physics, 1889.
A Brief History of the United States, 1880.
A Brief History of Ancient Peoples, 1881.
A Brief History of Greece: With Readings from Prominent Greek Historians, 1883.
A Brief History Of Ancient, Medieval and Modern Peoples, 1883, 1899.
New Descriptive Astronomy, A.S. Barnes & Company, 1869, 1884.
A Brief History of Rome, 1885.
A Brief History of The United States,1885.
Popular Zoology, 1887.

References

Further reading
Joel Dorman Steele, by Mrs. George Archibald, biography reviewed in New York Times September 8, 1900.
 Biography of Joel Dorman Steele- Chemung County Library District

External links
 
 
 Popular Zoology (1887) at Science History Institute Digital Collections

1836 births
1886 deaths
Syracuse University alumni
People from Lima, New York
Writers from Elmira, New York
Educators from New York (state)
19th-century American educators